Motoki Sakai (born 10 November 1995) is a Japanese handball player. He competed in the 2020 Summer Olympics, held July–August 2021 in Tokyo.

References

1995 births
Living people
Japanese male handball players
Olympic handball players of Japan
Handball players at the 2020 Summer Olympics
Handball players at the 2018 Asian Games
People from Isehara, Kanagawa
People from Inazawa
20th-century Japanese people
21st-century Japanese people